Radek Matějek (born 5 February 1973) is a Czech football referee. He has been a full international for FIFA since 2004.

Career statistics
Statistics for Gambrinus liga matches only.

References

External links
Radek Matějek on WorldReferee.com
Radek Matějek on weltfussball.de 

1973 births
Living people
Czech football referees